John Dunning (born January 9, 1942) is an American writer of non-fiction and detective fiction. He is known for his reference books on old-time radio and his series of mysteries featuring Denver bookseller and ex-policeman Cliff Janeway.

Life 
Born in Brooklyn, New York in 1942, Dunning moved to his father's hometown of Charleston, South Carolina, at the age of three. In 1964 he left his parents' home and moved to Denver, Colorado, where, after a time working as a stable hand at a horse racing track, he got a job at The Denver Post. In 1970 he left the newspaper and took up writing novels, while pursuing a variety of jobs. Partly because of trouble with his publishers, in 1984 he stopped writing and opened a store specializing in second-hand and rare books called the Old Algonquin Bookstore. At the urging of fellow authors, he returned to the world of novels in 1992 with his first Cliff Janeway novel, Booked to Die. In 1994 he closed the store and continued it as an internet and mail order business called Old Algonquin Books.

Dunning lives in Denver with his wife Helen.

Radio
In addition to compiling encyclopedic reference books about the history of radio programming, Dunning hosted a long-running weekly radio show, Old-Time Radio.

Works

Cliff Janeway novels
Booked to Die (1992)
The Bookman's Wake (1995)
The Bookman's Promise (2004)
The Sign of the Book (2005)
The Bookwoman's Last Fling (2006)

Other detective novels
The Holland Suggestions (1975)
Looking for Ginger North (1980)
Two O'Clock Eastern Wartime (2001)

Other novels
Denver (1980)
Deadline (1981)

Nonfiction
Tune in Yesterday: The Ultimate Encyclopedia of Old-Time Radio, 1925–1976 (1976)
On the Air: The Encyclopedia of Old-Time Radio (1998)

Awards
Dunning received his first award nomination in 1981, when Looking for Ginger North received an Edgar Award nomination for "Best Paperback Original". The following year, Deadline was nominated for this same honour.

Dunning's novel Booked to Die won the Nero Award and was nominated for the 1993 Anthony Award in the "Best Novel" category. The follow up to this novel, The Bookman's Wake, was nominated for the 1996 Edgar Award in the "Best Novel" running.

References

External links
 

1942 births
American mystery novelists
20th-century American novelists
Living people
Writers from Denver
Novelists from South Carolina
Nero Award winners
Dilys Award winners
The Denver Post people
21st-century American novelists
American male novelists
20th-century American male writers
21st-century American male writers
Novelists from Colorado